Apsaranycta is a monotypic moth genus of the family Noctuidae. Its only species, Apsaranycta bryophilina, is found in Mumbai, India. Both the genus and species were first described by George Hampson in 1914.

References

Acronictinae
Monotypic moth genera